Mamitupu Airport  is an airport serving Mamitupo, in the Guna Yala province of Panama.

Airlines and destinations

References

Airports in Panama
Guna Yala